Hellinsia punctata is a moth of the family Pterophoridae. It is found in the Democratic Republic of the Congo (Haut-Katanga).

References

Moths described in 2009
punctata
Moths of Africa
Insects of the Democratic Republic of the Congo
Endemic fauna of the Democratic Republic of the Congo